The Women's 50 Backstroke event at the 11th FINA World Aquatics Championships was swum 27 – 28 July 2005 in Montreal, Quebec, Canada. Preliminary (morning) and Semifinal (evening) heats were on 27 July, with the event's Final heat swum during the evening session on 28 July.

At the start of the vent, the existing World (WR) and Championships (CR) records were:
WR: 28.19, Janine Pietsch (Germany) swum 25 May 2005 in Berlin, Germany;
ER: 28.48, Nina Zhivanevskaya (Spain) swum 24 July 2004 in Barcelona, Spain

Results

Preliminaries

Semifinals

Final

References

Swimming at the 2005 World Aquatics Championships
2005 in women's swimming